Koreatown (also referred to as Little Seoul and the Korean Business District on nearby street signage) is on Garden Grove Boulevard between Beach Boulevard (Route 39) and Brookhurst Street in Garden Grove, Orange County, California.  The Korean population in Orange County more than doubled between 1990 and 2010.

See also
Little Saigon, Orange County
Little Gaza (Anaheim)

References

Further reading

Brody, Jeffrey. "Garden Grove Seeks to Ring up Business, Tourists for Little Seoul." The Orange County Register, 29 September 1986, Bl, B3. 

Korean-American culture in California
Geography of Garden Grove, California
Koreatowns in the United States
Orange County, California culture
Tourist attractions in Orange County, California